A kudi or kudhi is a bladed tool from Banyumas, Indonesia.

Description 
Like a parang, a kudi only has one sharp edge, however, it has a rather curved shape blade tip like a sickle, with an enlarged base. Similarly to the parang, kudi can be used to chop or cut wood and bamboo. Kudi with a slimmer blade may be used as a weapon. The hilt is usually made of wood that is at least as long as the blade. Some kudi blades are also fitted to a spear handle. In spear form, the length of the handle is usually between 65-180 cm.

Culture 
The kujang is often considered a development of the kudi. It is said that the word "kujang" came from "kudi hyang" (Gods' kudi). Banyumas version of Bagong puppet figures, called Bawor, depicted carrying a kudi (called curiga) as a weapon. Kudi is considered one of the cultural identities of the Banyumas people. The kudi is typically worn as part of the Banyumasan traditional attire by girding on the back of the waist.

Images

See also 
 Keris
 Celurit

References 

Knives
Machetes
Blade weapons
Indonesian culture
Weapons of Indonesia